Andres Briner (31 May 1923 – 1 June 2014) was a Swiss music historian, academic and art journalist

Life 
Briner was born in Zürich and educated at the University of Zurich. In musicology he was a student of Paul Hindemith. In 1953 he received his doctorate from Antoine-Elisée Cherbuliez at the University of Zurich.

He worked with Rolf Liebermann at the Zurich Radio Studio from 1953 to 1955, after which he went to the Department of Music at the University of Pennsylvania, where he taught until 1964. From 1964 to 1988 he was the successor of Willi Schuh as editor of the feature section of the Neue Zürcher Zeitung in the fields of music and musicology. Briner's main areas of work were the work of Paul Hindemith and New German School since 1880, as well as composers in Switzerland and the history of music in Zurich.

Briner died in Zürich at the age of 91

Honours 
 2006: Honorary Doctorate of the Faculty of Philosophy of the University of Zürich.

Publications 
 Der Wandel der Musik als Zeitkunst. Universal Edition, Vienna 1955 (Dissertation, Universität Zürich, 1953, als Versuch über die musikalische Zeitgestalt und ihre Wandlung in der europäischen Musik seit der mensuralen Mehrstimmigkeit).
 Paul Hindemith. Atlantis, Zürich und Freiburg, 1971.
 with Giselher Schubert, Dieter Rexroth: Paul Hindemith. Leben und Werk in Bild und Text. Schott, Mainz 1988, .In Italian: Paul Hindemith. Vita e opere. DeFerrari, Genua 1995, .
 Musikalische Koexistenz. Edittor Giselher Schubert. With a foreword by Hermann Danuser. Schott, Mainz 1993, .

External links

References 

Music historians
Swiss journalists
University of Pennsylvania faculty
1923 births
2014 deaths
People from Zürich